Edward Dominic Fenwick,  (August 19, 1768 – September 26, 1832) was an American prelate of the Catholic Church, a Dominican friar and the first Bishop of Cincinnati.

Early life
Edward Fenwick was born August 19, 1768 on the family plantation on the Patuxent River, in the Colony of Maryland to Colonel Ignatius Fenwick and Sarah Taney. Colonel Fenwick was a military figure of the American Revolution and one of the early Catholic families of Maryland. At that time, Jesuit missionaries ministered to Maryland Catholics. His first cousin Benedict J. Fenwick, a Jesuit, became the second bishop of Boston; another cousin, Enoch Fenwick was also ordained a Jesuit priest and was eventually named president of Georgetown College. Many families sent their sons abroad to study, and at sixteen years of age, Edward was sent to the Dominican Holy Cross College in Bornem, near Antwerp, Belgium, where his uncle was a teacher. The school was under the jurisdiction of the English Province of Dominicans.

In 1788 Fenwick joined the Dominican Order and entered the seminary at Bornem as a theological student, and chose the name, "Dominic". Edward Dominic Fenwick was ordained a priest on February 23, 1793 and became a professor at the Dominican College. When Belgium was invaded during the French Revolution, Fenwick was imprisoned, but later released upon proof of his American citizenship. The school re-located to Carshalton, England. Later, Fenwick taught at a Dominican school outside London.

With the assistance of Luke Concanen, assistant to the Master of the Dominican Order, Fr. Fenwick received permission to return to the United States and to establish a Dominican college. He arrived in America in the autumn off 1804, accompanied by Friar Robert Angier. He was received by Bishop John Carroll, who suggested that Fr. Fenwick and the Dominicans who accompanied him should evangelize the vast regions of the United States west of the Appalachian Mountains, including the territories acquired in the 1803 Louisiana Purchase.

Missionary Work
In 1805, Fr. Fenwick traversed the entire Mississippi Valley looking for a central location to continue his missionary work. Three other Dominican priests were Samuel Thomas Wilson, a Master of Sacred Theology, Robert Antoninus Angier, a Lectorate in Sacred Theology and Preacher General, and William Raymond Tuite.

In 1806, Fenwick purchased a 500-acre plantation near Springfield, Kentucky. Construction of a priory and a church began almost immediately and was first inhabited in December 1806 but not completed until 1807. St. Rose Priory was named for the Dominican St. Rose of Lima, the first native of the Americas to be canonized. In February 1807 the new American Province of St. Joseph was approved. At Fenwick's request, Samuel Wilson was appointed prior.

The church was dedicated December 25, 1809. St. Rose Priory was the first Catholic educational institution west of the Alleghenies. The first bishop of the new (in 1808) Diocese of Bardstown, Benedict Joseph Flaget, used the priory until the Bardstown St. Joseph Proto-Cathedral was built. Saint Thomas of Aquinas College was added later, completed in 1812. Jefferson Davis was among its earliest students.

The difficulties of life as an itinerant preacher were many, not the least being exposure to extremes of weather. While riding from place to place, he read his breviary on horseback. Fenwick was known to ride forty miles out of his way to visit an isolated family. He often fasted while travelling, in anticipation of celebrating Mass once he reached his destination. Often Fenwick had to swim his horse across swollen streams to reach a mission. Frequently he was obliged while travelling, to spend the night in the Kentucky backwoods, populated by bear and wolves. The missionaries who ministered to the scattered communities on the frontier generally worked alone, and the strain of loneliness and overwork could serve to undermine their health.

In 1808, Fenwick reached Ohio, where he ministered to predominantly German and Irish families, many of whom knew little English. In 1817 he was joined by his newly ordained nephew, Fr. Nicholas Dominic Young OP. The first church in Ohio, was built in Somerset and dedicated to St. Joseph on December 6, 1818. A second log church, dedicated to the Blessed Virgin Mary, was soon erected in Lancaster. A third was begun in Cincinnati, at the suggestion of Bishop Flaget, who visited the city in the spring of 1818.

Episcopacy
On January 13, 1822, Edward Dominic Fenwick was consecrated as the first Bishop of the Diocese of Cincinnati.  The consecration was celebrated at Saint Rose Church as there was no cathedral in Cincinnati. He went to Europe in 1823 to raise funding for the new diocese and returned in 1826 with resources to begin the construction of the cathedral, parochial schools, and to found the convents of the Sisters of Charity and of the first community of Dominican women in the United States that became Dominicans of St. Catharine (now the Dominican Sisters of Peace).

In 1829 Bishop Fenwick established the St. Francis Xavier Seminary.  This was the third oldest Catholic seminary in the United States and the oldest Catholic seminary west of the Appalachian Mountains. The Athenaeum of Ohio-Mount St. Mary Seminary claims its roots through the St. Francis Xavier Seminary and is located in Cincinnati

In her book Domestic Manners of the Americans, Fanny Trollope wrote of Fenwick:

I had the pleasure of being introduced to the Catholic bishop of Cincinnati, and have never known in any country a priest of a character and bearing more truly apostolic. He was an American, but I should never have discovered it from his pronunciation or manner. He received his education partly in England, and partly in France. His manners were highly polished; his piety active and sincere, and infinitely more mild and tolerant than that of the factious Sectarians who form the great majority of the American priesthood.

In 1831 Bishop Fenwick initiated publication of The Catholic Telegraph diocesan newspaper. The weekly newspaper was carried by stage and riverboat to areas within the diocese's government, as well as to cities in Kentucky, Missouri, Pennsylvania, Maryland and the District of Columbia. The Catholic Telegraph is still in existence today as the oldest continuously-published Catholic newspaper in the United States.

Also in 1831, Bishop Fenwick founded The Athenaeum, which later evolved into Xavier University and St. Xavier High School.

After the college was established he returned to missionary work, visiting the Indian tribes in the Northwestern territory. Stricken by cholera, he died in Wooster, Ohio on September 26, 1832, aged 64. He is buried in a mausoleum in the new St. Joseph Cemetery, Delhi Township, Hamilton County, OH.

Legacy
Several schools are named in his honor:
Bishop Fenwick High School, Franklin Township, Ohio
Fenwick High School, Oak Park, Illinois
Fenwick High School, Lancaster, Ohio (now the William V. Fisher Catholic High School)
Bishop Fenwick Middle School, Zanesville, Ohio

Notes

References
 Lamott, S.T.D., John H., History of the Archdiocese of Cincinnati, (1921)

External links
Bio of Edward Fenwick
History of St Rose Priory
History of the Athenaeum of Ohio
Episcopal lineage of Bishop Edward Dominic Fenwick, O.P.
Fenwick High School (Franklin, Ohio)
Fenwick High School (Oak Park, Illinois)

1768 births
1832 deaths
Deaths from cholera
American Dominicans
Dominican bishops
19th-century Roman Catholic bishops in the United States
Infectious disease deaths in Ohio
Roman Catholic bishops of Cincinnati